The 2022–23 Charlotte Hornets season is the 33rd season of the franchise in the National Basketball Association (NBA). On April 22, 2022, the Charlotte Hornets fired James Borrego after four years with the team with no playoff appearances. The Hornets failed to improve on their 43-39 record the previous season, with their 40th loss coming on February 5th to Orlando.

Draft

Roster

Standings

Division

Conference

Game log

Preseason

|-style="background:#fcc;"
| 1
| October 2
| @ Boston
| 
| Kelly Oubre Jr. (17)
| Ball, Richards (7)
| LaMelo Ball (4)
| TD Garden19,156
| 0–1
|-style="background:#fcc;"
| 2
| October 5
| Indiana
| 
| Terry Rozier (18)
| Oubre Jr., Plumlee (9)
| LaMelo Ball (7)
| Spectrum Center9,382
| 0–2
|-style="background:#fcc;"
| 3
| October 7
| Boston
| 
| LaMelo Ball (23)
| Mason Plumlee (10)
| LaMelo Ball (9)
| Greensboro Coliseum16,119
| 0–3
|-style="background:#fcc;"
| 4
| October 10
| Washington
| 
| Terry Rozier (24)
| Nick Richards (8)
| LaMelo Ball (3)
| Spectrum Center9,478
| 0–4
|-style="background:#fcc;"
| 5
| October 12
| @ Philadelphia
| 
| Gordon Hayward (16)
| Hayward, Richards (7)
| Mason Plumlee (5)
| Wells Fargo Center19,778
| 0–5

Regular season

|-style="background:#cfc;
| 1
| October 19
| @ San Antonio
| 
| Terry Rozier (24)
| Nick Richards (10)
| Terry Rozier (6)
| AT&T Center16,236
| 1–0
|- style="background:#fcc;"
| 2
| October 21
| New Orleans
| 
| Gordon Hayward (26)
| Terry Rozier (8)
| Terry Rozier (11)
| Spectrum Center19,287
| 1–1
|- style="background:#cfc;"
| 3
| October 23
| @ Atlanta
| 
| Kelly Oubre Jr. (24)
| Nick Richards (11)
| Plumlee, Smith Jr. (6)
| State Farm Arena17,383
| 2–1
|- style="background:#fcc;"
| 4
| October 26
| @ New York
| 
| Gordon Hayward (21)
| Gordon Hayward (9)
| Dennis Smith Jr. (11)
| Madison Square Garden19,812
| 2–2
|- style="background:#fcc;"
| 5
| October 28
| @ Orlando
| 
| Gordon Hayward (18)
| Jalen McDaniels (7)
| Plumlee, Smith Jr. (4)
| Amway Center18,846
| 2–3
|-style="background:#cfc"
| 6
| October 29
| Golden State
| 
| P. J. Washington (31)
| Jalen McDaniels (11)
| Dennis Smith Jr. (8)
| Spectrum Center19,079
| 3–3
|- style="background:#fcc;"
| 7
| October 31
| Sacramento
| 
| P. J. Washington (28)
| Mason Plumlee (10)
| Dennis Smith Jr. (8)
| Spectrum Center12,020
| 3–4

|- style="background:#fcc;"
| 8
| November 2
| @ Chicago
| 
| Kelly Oubre Jr. (24)
| Mason Plumlee (13)
| Dennis Smith Jr. (6)
| United Center17,886
| 3–5
|- style="background:#fcc;"
| 9
| November 4
| @ Memphis
| 
| Kelly Oubre Jr. (17)
| Nick Richards (9)
| Bouknight, Smith Jr. (5)
| FedExForum17,187
| 3–6
|- style="background:#fcc;"
| 10
| November 5
| Brooklyn
| 
| Terry Rozier (25)
| Mason Plumlee (11)
| James Bouknight (5)
| Spectrum Center19,398
| 3–7
|- style="background:#fcc;"
| 11
| November 7
| Washington
| 
| P. J. Washington (25)
| Mason Plumlee (10)
| Dennis Smith Jr. (10)
| Spectrum Center13,712
| 3–8
|- style="background:#fcc;"
| 12
| November 9
| Portland
| 
| Terry Rozier (18)
| Mason Plumlee (12)
| Terry Rozier (5)
| Spectrum Center14,774
| 3–9
|- style="background:#fcc;"
| 13
| November 10
| @ Miami
| 
| Kelly Oubre Jr. (29)
| Mason Plumlee (15)
| Dennis Smith Jr. (8)
| FTX Arena19,600
| 3–10
|- style="background:#fcc;"
| 14
| November 12
| @ Miami
| 
| Terry Rozier (22)
| P. J. Washington (8)
| Ball, Rozier (6)
| FTX Arena19,600
| 3–11
|-style="background:#cfc;
| 15
| November 14
| @ Orlando
| 
| Mason Plumlee (18)
| Mason Plumlee (10)
| LaMelo Ball (9)
| Amway Center15,018
| 4–11
|-style="background:#fcc;"
| 16
| November 16
| Indiana
| 
| LaMelo Ball (26)
| Mason Plumlee (10)
| Terry Rozier (8)
| Spectrum Center14,756
| 4–12
|-style="background:#fcc;"
| 17
| November 18
| @ Cleveland
| 
| Kelly Oubre Jr. (34)
| Nick Richards (14)
| Gordon Hayward (7)
| Rocket Mortgage FieldHouse19,432
| 4–13
|-style="background:#fcc;"
| 18
| November 20
| @ Washington
| 
| Kelly Oubre Jr. (23)
| Nick Richards (10)
| Terry Rozier (5)
| Capital One Arena14,289
| 4–14
|-style="background:#cfc;"
| 19
| November 23
| Philadelphia
| 
| Terry Rozier (22)
| Plumlee, Richards (13)
| Plumlee, Rozier (6)
| Spectrum Center16,910
| 5–14
|-style="background:#cfc;"
| 20
| November 25
| Minnesota
| 
| Kelly Oubre Jr. (28)
| Jones, Plumlee (12)
| Terry Rozier (8)
| Spectrum Center17,924
| 6–14
|-style="background:#fcc;"
| 21
| November 28
| @ Boston
| 
| Jalen McDaniels (24)
| Nick Richards (7)
| Théo Maledon (8)
| TD Garden19,156
| 6–15

|-style="background:#cfc;"
| 22
| December 2
| Washington
| 
| Terry Rozier (25)
| Mason Plumlee (10)
| Terry Rozier (8)
| Spectrum Center15,231
| 7–15
|-style="background:#fcc;"
| 23
| December 3
| Milwaukee
| 
| Terry Rozier (26)
| Mason Plumlee (11)
| P. J. Washington (5)
| Spectrum Center18,128
| 7–16
|-style="background:#fcc;"
| 24
| December 5
| L.A. Clippers
| 
| Kelly Oubre Jr. (28)
| Mason Plumlee (12)
| Terry Rozier (8)
| Spectrum Center13,945
| 7–17
|-style="background:#fcc;"
| 25
| December 7
| @ Brooklyn
| 
| Terry Rozier (29)
| Mason Plumlee (11)
| P. J. Washington (7)
| Barclays Center16,903
| 7–18
|-style="background:#fcc;"
| 26
| December 9
| New York
| 
| Terry Rozier (24)
| Mason Plumlee (9)
| Terry Rozier (4)
| Spectrum Center17,696
| 7–19
|-style="background:#fcc;"
| 27
| December 11
| @ Philadelphia
| 
| Oubre Jr., Rozier (29)
| Mason Plumlee (12)
| Terry Rozier (6)
| Wells Fargo Center19,765
| 7–20
|-style="background:#fcc;"
| 28
| December 14
| Detroit
| 
| Kelly Oubre Jr. (28)
| Mason Plumlee (18)
| LaMelo Ball (11)
| Spectrum Center14,303
| 7–21
|-style="background:#fcc;"
| 29
| December 16
| Atlanta
| 
| LaMelo Ball (27)
| Nick Richards (11)
| Terry Rozier (9)
| Spectrum Center17,772
| 7–22
|-style="background:#fcc;"
| 30
| December 18
| @ Denver
| 
| LaMelo Ball (31)
| Gordon Hayward (10)
| LaMelo Ball (5)
| Ball Arena19,235
| 7–23
|-style="background:#cfc;"
| 31
| December 19
| @ Sacramento
| 
| Kelly Oubre Jr. (31)
| Nick Richards (11)
| LaMelo Ball (12)
| Golden 1 Center17,803
| 8–23
|-style=background:#fcc;"
| 32
| December 21
| @ L.A. Clippers
| 
| LaMelo Ball (25)
| LaMelo Ball (11)
| LaMelo Ball (12)
| Crypto.com Arena19,068
| 8–24
|-style=background:#cfc;"
| 33
| December 23
| @ L.A. Lakers
| 
| P. J. Washington (24)
| Ball, Plumlee (8)
| LaMelo Ball (8)
| Crypto.com Arena18,997
| 9–24
|-style="background:#fcc;"
| 34
| December 26
| @ Portland
| 
| LaMelo Ball (27)
| Mason Plumlee (8)
| LaMelo Ball (7)
| Moda Center19,530
| 9–25
|-style="background:#fcc;"
| 35
| December 27
| @ Golden State
| 
| LaMelo Ball (21)
| Mason Plumlee (13)
| Ball, Plumlee, Rozier (4)
| Chase Center18,064
| 9–26
|-style="background:#cfc;"
| 36
| December 29
| Oklahoma City
| 
| LaMelo Ball (27)
| Mark Williams (13)
| LaMelo Ball (9)
| Spectrum Center19,425
| 10–26
|-style="background:#fcc;"
| 37
| December 31
| Brooklyn 
| 
| LaMelo Ball (23)
| Mason Plumlee (10)
| LaMelo Ball (11)
| Spectrum Center19,386
| 10–27

|-style="background:#fcc;"
| 38
| January 2
| L.A. Lakers 
| 
| Terry Rozier (27)
| Mason Plumlee (14)
| LaMelo Ball (6)
| Spectrum Center19,210
| 10–28
|-style="background:#fcc;" 
| 39
| January 4
| Memphis
| 
| LaMelo Ball (23) 
| Mason Plumlee (10) 
| LaMelo Ball (12) 
| Spectrum Center19,077
| 10–29
|-style="background:#cfc"
| 40
| January 6
| @ Milwaukee
| 
| Terry Rozier (39)
| Mason Plumlee (15)
| LaMelo Ball (12)
| Fiserv Forum 17,627
| 11–29
|-style="background:#fcc"
| 41
| January 8
| @ Indiana
| 
| P. J. Washington (22)
| Mason Plumlee (13)
| LaMelo Ball (8)
| Gainbridge Fieldhouse15,805
| 11–30
|-style="background:#fcc"
| 42
| January 10
| @ Toronto
| 
| Terry Rozier (33)
| McDaniels, Plumlee (7)
| LaMelo Ball (14)
| Scotiabank Arena 19,800
| 11–31
|-style="background:#fcc"
| 43
| January 12
| @ Toronto
| 
| LaMelo Ball (32)
| Mason Plumlee (15)
| Ball, Smith Jr. (7)
| Scotiabank Arena 19,800
| 11–32
|-style="background:#fcc"
| 44
| January 14
| Boston
| 
| LaMelo Ball (31)
| Mason Plumlee (16)
| LaMelo Ball (9)
| Spectrum Center19,608
| 11–33
|-style="background:#fcc"
| 45
| January 16
| Boston
| 
| Jalen McDaniels (26)
| Mason Plumlee (12)
| Plumlee, Rozier (7)
| Spectrum Center19,227
| 11–34
|-style="background:#cfc"
| 46
| January 18
| @ Houston
| 
| Terry Rozier (26)
| Mason Plumlee (9)
| Dennis Smith Jr. (7)
| Toyota Center15,678
| 12–34
|-style="background:#cfc;"
| 47
| January 21
| @ Atlanta
| 
| Terry Rozier (34)
| Mason Plumlee (11)
| Dennis Smith Jr. (7)
| State Farm Arena17,928
| 13–34
|-style="background:#fcc"
| 48
| January 23
| @ Utah
| 
| Terry Rozier (23)
| Jalen McDaniels (9)
| Dennis Smith Jr. (9)
| Vivint Arena18,206
| 13–35
|-style="background:#fcc"
| 49
| January 24
| @ Phoenix
| 
| Terry Rozier (19)
| Jalen McDaniels (10)
| Terry Rozier (5)
| Footprint Center17,071
| 13–36
|-style="background:#cfc"
| 50
| January 26
| Chicago
| 
| Terry Rozier (28)
| Mason Plumlee (12)
| LaMelo Ball (8)
| Spectrum Center17,697
| 14–36
|-style="background:#cfc"
| 51
| January 29
| Miami
| 
| Terry Rozier (31)
| Mason Plumlee (8)
| Ball, Rozier (7)
| Spectrum Center19,254
| 15–36
|-style="background:#fcc"
| 52
| January 31
| @ Milwaukee
| 
| LaMelo Ball (27)
| Mason Plumlee (14)
| LaMelo Ball (11)
| Fiserv Forum17,341
| 15–37

|-style="background:#fcc"
| 53
| February 2
| @ Chicago
| 
| Terry Rozier (23)
| Mason Plumlee (11)
| LaMelo Ball (6)
| United Center20,072
| 15–38
|-style="background:#fcc"
| 54
| February 3
| @ Detroit
| 
| Ball, Rozier (23)
| LaMelo Ball (8)
| LaMelo Ball (8)
| Little Caesars Arena18,007
| 15–39
|-style="background:#fcc"
| 55
| February 5
| Orlando
| 
| LaMelo Ball (33)
| Mason Plumlee (9)
| Ball, Rozier (6)
| Spectrum Center18,510
| 15–40
|-style="background:#fcc;"
| 56
| February 8
| @ Washington
| 
| P. J. Washington (20)
| Mark Williams (8)
| Terry Rozier (6)
| Capital One Arena16,097
| 15–41
|-style="background:#fcc;"
| 57
| February 10
| @ Boston
| 
| Terry Rozier (27)
| Mark Williams (12)
| LaMelo Ball (10)
| TD Garden19,156
| 15–42
|-style="background:#fcc;"
| 58
| February 11
| Denver
| 
| P. J. Washington (22)
| LaMelo Ball (9)
| LaMelo Ball (12)
| Spectrum Center19,256
| 15–43
|-style="background:#cfc;"
| 59
| February 13
| Atlanta
| 
| LaMelo Ball (30)
| P. J. Washington (7)
| LaMelo Ball (15)
| Spectrum Center14,078
| 16–43
|-style="background:#cfc;"
| 60
| February 15
| San Antonio
| 
| LaMelo Ball (28)
| LaMelo Ball (12)
| LaMelo Ball (10)
| Spectrum Center14,155
| 17–43
|-style="background:#cfc;"
| 61
| February 24
| @ Minnesota
| 
| LaMelo Ball (32)
| Gordon Hayward (13)
| LaMelo Ball (8)
| Target Center17,136
| 18–43
|-style="background:#cfc;"
| 62
| February 25
| Miami
| 
| Gordon Hayward (21)
| Mark Williams (20)
| LaMelo Ball (13)
| Spectrum Center19,109
| 19–43
|-style="background:#cfc;"
| 63
| February 27
| Detroit
| 
| Terry Rozier (22)
| Mark Williams (11)
| Dennis Smith Jr. (7)
| Spectrum Center14,184
| 20–43

|-style="background:#fcc;"
| 64
| March 1
| Phoenix
| 
| Kelly Oubre Jr. (26)
| Mark Williams (10)
| Dennis Smith Jr. (6)
| Spectrum Center19,137
| 20–44
|-style="background:#fcc;"
| 65
| March 3
| Orlando
| 
| Kelly Oubre Jr. (29)
| Kelly Oubre Jr. (10)
| Gordon Hayward (7)
| Spectrum Center16,683
| 20–45
|-style="background:#fcc;"
| 66
| March 5
| @ Brooklyn
| 
| Kelly Oubre Jr. (17)
| Mark Williams (14)
| Dennis Smith Jr. (6)
| Barclays Center17,921
| 20–46
|-style="background:#cfc;"
| 67
| March 7
| @ New York
| 
| Kelly Oubre Jr. (27)
| Gordon Hayward (9)
| Gordon Hayward (8)
| Madison Square Garden19,812
| 21–46
|-style="background:#cfc;"
| 68
| March 9
| @ Detroit
| 
| Kelly Oubre Jr. (27)
| Nick Richards (10)
| Terry Rozier (9)
| Little Caesars Arena17,121
| 22–46
|-style="background:#fcc;"
| 69
| March 11
| Utah
| 
| Kelly Oubre Jr. (24)
| Nick Richards (8)
| Terry Rozier (8)
| Spectrum Center17,221
| 22–47
|-style="background:#fcc;"
| 70
| March 12
| Cleveland
|  
| Terry Rozier (27)
| Nick Richards (12)
| Dennis Smith Jr. (7)
| Spectrum Center17,342
| 22–48
|-style="background:#fcc;"
| 71
| March 14
| Cleveland
| 
| Kelly Oubre Jr. (28)
| Nick Richards (8)
| Terry Rozier (9)
| Spectrum Center14,690
| 22–49
|-style="background:#fcc;"
| 72
| March 17
| Philadelphia
| 
| Terry Rozier (14)
| Kai Jones (9)
| Dennis Smith Jr. (8)
| Spectrum Center19,096
| 22–50
|-
| 73
| March 20
| Indiana
|  
|  
|  
|  
| Spectrum Center 
| 
|-
| 74
| March 23
| @ New Orleans
|  
|  
|  
|  
| Smoothie King Center 
| 
|-
| 75
| March 24
| @ Dallas
|  
|  
|  
|  
| American Airlines Center 
| 
|-
| 76
| March 26
| Dallas
|  
|  
|  
|  
| Spectrum Center 
| 
|-
| 77
| March 28
| Oklahoma City
|  
|  
|  
|  
| Paycom Center 
| 
|-
| 78
| March 31
| Chicago
|  
|  
|  
|  
| Spectrum Center 
| 
|-

Transactions

Trades

Free Agency

Re-signed

Additions

Subtractions

References

Charlotte Hornets seasons
Charlotte Hornets
Charlotte Hornets
Charlotte Hornets